Antonio Ibáñez Freire (25 September 1913 – 9 May 2003) was a Spanish politician and military commander. He was minister of the interior of Spain from April 1979 to May 1980.

Biography
He was born in Vitoria. After passing the Military Academy of Zaragoza, he was appointed lieutenant of infantry and participated in the Spanish Civil War revolting against the Second Spanish Republic. Later, he enlisted as a volunteer in the Blue Division taking part in the Second World War, in which he was awarded the Iron Cross by Nazi Germany. He was civil governor of the province of Santander in 1960 and occupied the same position in Vizcaya (1961) and Barcelona (1963).

In 1978, he was appointed Captain General of the Fourth Military Region. In April 1979, he was appointed minister of interior to the cabinet led by prime minister Adolfo Suárez. Freire replaced Rodolfo Martín as interior minister. Freire was in office until May 1980 and Juan José Rosón replaced him in the post.

Awards and decorations
 Military Medal (Spain), Individual and Collective awards
 Grand Cross of the Order of Charles III
 Grand Cross of the Royal and Military Order of Saint Hermenegild
 Grand Cross of Military Merit
 Grand Cross of Naval Merit
 Grand Cross of Aeronautical Merit
 Grand Cross of the Order of Isabella the Catholic
 Grand Cross of the Order of Cisneros
 Grand Cross of the Imperial Order of the Yoke and Arrows
 Grand Cross of the Order of the Holy Sepulchre
 Great Star of Military Merit of the Chilean Army
 Grand Cross of the Order of Ruben Dario (Nicaragua).
 Medal of Suffering for the country
 Gold Medal of the city of Bilbao
 Gold Medal of the city of Barcelona
 Iron Cross of 1939, 2nd class

References

1913 births
2003 deaths
People from Vitoria-Gasteiz
Spanish military personnel of the Spanish Civil War (National faction)
Spanish military personnel of World War II
Recipients of the Military Medal (Spain)
Grand Crosses of the Royal and Military Order of San Hermenegild
Grand Crosses of Military Merit
Grand Crosses of Naval Merit
Crosses of Aeronautical Merit
Knights Grand Cross of the Order of Isabella the Catholic
Recipients of the Iron Cross (1939), 2nd class
Politicians from the Basque Country (autonomous community)
Knights of the Holy Sepulchre
Interior ministers of Spain
Civil governors of Barcelona